Lechenaultia subcymosa, commonly known as wide-branching leschenaultia,
is a species of flowering plant in the family Goodeniaceae and is endemic to the far west of south-western Western Australia. It is an ascending herb or subshrub with only a few widely spreading branches, narrow, rigid leaves crowded on short, leafy stems, and creamy-white to pale mauve flowers.

Description

Taxonomy
Lechenaultia subcymosa was first formally described in 1963 by Charles Gardner and Alex George in the Journal of the Royal Society of Western Australia from specimens collected by George near Learmonth in 1962. The specific epithet (subcymosa) means "somewhat cymose".

Distribution and habitat
Wide-branching leschenaultia grows in shallow soil over limestone in low shrubland in near-coastal areas on the North West Cape and on islands in Shark Bay, in the Carnarvon, Geraldton Sandplains and Yalgoo biogeographic regions of far western Western Australia.

Conservation status
This leschenaultia is listed as "not threatened" by the Government of Western Australia Department of Biodiversity, Conservation and Attractions.

References

Asterales of Australia
subcymosa
Eudicots of Western Australia
Plants described in 1963
Taxa named by Charles Gardner
Taxa named by Alex George